This is a list of series released by or aired on TVB Jade Channel in 1981.

External links
  TVB.com

TVB dramas